Mayfield School, previously St Leonards-Mayfield School, is an independent Catholic boarding and day school for girls aged 11 to 18. It is situated in the village of Mayfield in East Sussex. The current headmistress is Miss Antonia Beary. The school was founded by Mother Cornelia Connelly, S.H.C.J., in 1872, with the oldest buildings dating from the 14th century.

History 
Mayfield School has its origins in the Convent of the Holy Child Jesus school at St Leonards-on-Sea. Mother Cornelia Connelly of the Society of the Holy Child Jesus chanced upon the Old Palace at the idyllic village of Mayfield. At that time Louisa Caton, the Duchess of Leeds (widow of Francis D'Arcy-Osborne, 7th Duke of Leeds) had requested Mother Connelly to take her in as a nun. Despite her efforts Mother Connelly remained unimpressed. The Duchess then turned her attention to setting up orphanages. She purchased the Mayfield estate which included the Old Palace and presented it to the Society. On the morning of 18 November 1863 Mass was celebrated at Mayfield for the first time since the mid-16th century. The original school at St Leonards and the new school at Mayfield merged in 1953 to form the current school. The junior school was closed in 1975 and St Leonards-Mayfield thus became solely a senior school. In March 2015 the school changed its name to Mayfield School, but it retains its strong links with the SHCJ. The teachers are mostly lay staff but the nuns still maintain a strong presence as members of the Board of Governors and pastoral care staff.

Old Palace 
The Old Palace was originally a holiday residence of the Archbishops of Canterbury during the 14th and 15th centuries. During the Reformation, it was handed over to King Henry VIII who gave it to several leading noblemen of his day. Thomas Gresham lived there and Queen Elizabeth I was among his guests at the Old Palace. It was bought by the Baker family, a prominent family in the iron foundry industry. As the iron industry began to decline, so did the family's fortunes. The Old Palace became derelict and abandoned by the mid 18th century. It has since been designated a Grade I listed building.

Location and facilities 

The school is located within the village of Mayfield, less than 40 miles from the centre of London. At the heart of the school are the 14th century chapel built for the Archbishops of Canterbury and a concert hall designed by Sir Giles Gilbert Scott. The sports facilities include a new all-weather pitch, eight new all-weather tennis and netball courts, an indoor swimming pool and one of the largest outdoor riding arenas in the South East of England. The creative and performing arts are served by a music school, ceramics and arts studios and a dance hall. There is also a purpose built science block.

There are four boarding houses at the school: Leeds House (named after the Duchess of Leeds who donated the Old Palace to the SHCJ), Connelly House (formerly known as St Gabriels), Gresham House and St Dunstans House providing boarding accommodation in individual rooms for the Sixth Form.

Links with other Holy Child schools 

The Society of the Holy Child Jesus still runs a network of schools across its three provinces: Europe, Africa and America.

Mayfield actively maintains and strengthens links with other Holy Child Schools. In 2010 children from the Cornelia Connelly School in Anaheim, California visited Mayfield and the headmistress visited Holy Child College in Ikoyi, Nigeria.

Former pupils 

Former pupils of Mayfield and her sister Holy Child Schools which are now closed are known as Old Cornelians, named after Mother Cornelia Connelly who founded the Society of the Holy Child Jesus. They include:

 Anouk Aimée
 Sophia Bennett
 Lindka Cierach
 Emily Craig
 Alondra de la Parra
 Maeve Gilmore
 Caroline Goodall
 Dione Gordon-Finlay
 Olivia Hetreed
 Judith Kazantzis
 Ann Leslie
 Helena Little
 Clare McLaren-Throckmorton
 Folu Storms

References

External links

Profile on the ISC website

Private schools in East Sussex
Boarding schools in East Sussex
Girls' schools in East Sussex
Catholic boarding schools in England
Roman Catholic private schools in the Diocese of Arundel and Brighton
Member schools of the Girls' Schools Association
Educational institutions established in 1872
1872 establishments in England
Grade I listed buildings in East Sussex
Grade I listed educational buildings
School